Love Spit Love is the debut studio album by the rock band Love Spit Love. It was released in 1994 on Imago Records.

Production
The album was recorded in New York City, and produced by Dave Jerden.

Critical reception
The Riverfront Times called the album a "fantastic moodpiece" and a "bargain bin treasure." Trouser Press wrote that Richard Butler's "nicotine-coated growl has, over the years, mellowed into a powerful scratchy croon that shimmers on his most accessible record since the Furs’ glory days."

Track listing
"Seventeen" (Richard Butler, Tim Butler, Richard Fortus) – 4:17
"Superman" (R. Butler, T. Butler) – 4:14
"Half a Life" (R. Butler, T. Butler) – 4:10
"Jigsaw" (R. Butler, Fortus) – 4:08
"Change in the Weather" (R. Butler) – 3:11
"Wake Up" (R. Butler, Fortus) – 4:02
"Am I Wrong" (R. Butler, T. Butler) – 3:34
"Green" (R. Butler, Fortus) – 5:11
"Please" (R. Butler, T. Butler) – 4:46
"Codeine" (R. Butler, Eric Schermerhorn) – 4:51
"St. Mary's Gate" (R. Butler, Fortus) – 5:26
"More" (R. Butler, T. Butler) – 4:00

Some international versions included the bonus track "All She Wants."

Personnel
Love Spit Love
Richard Butler – vocals
Richard Fortus – guitar, cello, mandolin
Frank Ferrer – drums
Tim Butler – bass guitar

Additional personnel
Jon Brion – chamberlin, optigan, piano
Eric Schermerhorn – acoustic guitar on "Codeine"
John Phillip Shendle – string arrangements

Charts

References

1994 debut albums
Albums produced by Dave Jerden
Love Spit Love albums